The Waterboys are a Scottish folk rock band formed in Edinburgh in 1983 by musician Mike Scott. The band's membership, past and present, has been composed mainly of musicians from Scotland, Ireland, Wales and England. Mike Scott has remained as the only constant member throughout the band's career. They have explored a number of different styles, but their music is mainly a mix of folk music with rock and roll. They dissolved in 1993 when Scott departed to pursue a solo career. The group reformed in 2000, and continue to release albums and to tour worldwide. Scott emphasises a continuity between The Waterboys and his solo work, saying that "To me there's no difference between Mike Scott and the Waterboys; they both mean the same thing. They mean myself and whoever are my current travelling musical companions."

The early Waterboys sound became known as "The Big Music" after a song on their second album, A Pagan Place. This style was described by Scott as "a metaphor for seeing God's signature in the world." Waterboys chronicler Ian Abrahams elaborated on this by defining "The Big Music" as "...a mystical celebration of paganism. It's extolling the basic and primitive divinity that exists in everything ('the oceans and the sand'), religious and spiritual all encompassing. Here is something that can't be owned or built upon, something that has its existence in the concept of Mother Earth and has an ancestral approach to religion. And it takes in and embraces the feminine side of divinity, pluralistic in its acceptance of the wider pantheon of paganism."

"The Big Music" either influenced or was used to describe a number of other bands specializing in an anthemic sound, including U2, Simple Minds, In Tua Nua, Big Country and Hothouse Flowers.

In the late 1980s, the band became significantly more folk-influenced. The Waterboys eventually returned to rock and roll, and have released both rock and folk albums since reforming.

History
The Waterboys have gone through three distinct phases. Their early years, or "Big Music" period was followed by a folk music period which was characterised by an emphasis on touring over album production and by a large band membership, leading to the description of the group as a "Raggle Taggle band". After a brief return to the "Big Music" for one tour and the release of a mainstream rock and roll album with Dream Harder, the band dissolved until they reunited in 2000. In the years since, they have revisited both rock and folk music, and continue to tour and release studio albums.

Formation 
Scott, the founder and only permanent member of The Waterboys, made a number of solo recordings in late 1981 and early 1982 while in a band named Another Pretty Face (later called Funhouse). These sessions at Redshop Studio are the earliest recordings that would be released under the Waterboys' name. During the same period, Scott formed the short-lived band The Red and the Black, with saxophone player Anthony Thistlethwaite, after hearing him play on Waiting on Egypt, a Nikki Sudden album. The Red and the Black performed nine concerts in London. Thistlethwaite introduced Scott to drummer Kevin Wilkinson, who joined The Red and the Black. During 1982, Scott made a number of recordings, both solo and with Thistlethwaite and Wilkinson. These recording sessions, both of Scott's solo work and the group performances, would later be divided between The Waterboys' first and second albums.

In 1983, even though Scott's record label, Ensign Records, expected his first album to be a solo effort, Scott decided to start a new band. He chose The Waterboys as its name from a line in the Lou Reed song "The Kids" on the album Berlin. In March 1983, Ensign released the first recording under the new band name, a single titled "A Girl Called Johnny", the A-side of which was a tribute to Patti Smith. This was followed in May by The Waterboys' first performance as a group, on the BBC's Old Grey Whistle Test. The BBC performance included a new member, keyboard player Karl Wallinger. The Waterboys released their self-titled debut, The Waterboys, in July 1983. Their music, influenced by Patti Smith, Bob Dylan and David Bowie, was compared by critics to Van Morrison and U2 in its cinematic sweep. The band's earlier sound was described as new wave and post-punk.

Early years: the Big Music 

After the release of their debut, The Waterboys began touring. Their first show was at the Batschkapp Club in Frankfurt in February 1984. The band then consisted of Mike Scott on vocals and guitar, Anthony Thistlethwaite on saxophone and mandolin, Wallinger on keyboards, Roddy Lorimer on trumpets, Martyn Swain on bass and Kevin Wilkinson on drums. John Caldwell from Another Pretty Face also played guitar, and Scottish singer Eddi Reader sang backing vocals for the band's first two concerts. The band made some new recordings and over-dubbed old material in late 1983 and early 1984 which were released as The Waterboys' second album, A Pagan Place, in June 1984. The "official" Waterboys line-up at this time, according to the sleeve of A Pagan Place, was Scott, Thistlethwaite, Wallinger and Wilkinson, with guest contributions from Reader, Lorimer and many others.

A Pagan Place was preceded by the single "The Big Music". The name of the single's A-side track was adopted by some commentators as a description of The Waterboys' sound, and is still used to refer to the musical style of their first three albums. The release of the album was followed by further touring in the U.K., Europe and U.S. including support for The Pretenders and U2 and a show at the Glastonbury Festival.

The band began to record new material in early 1985 for a new album, with Wilkinson leaving the band to join China Crisis. Late in the sessions, future Waterboy Steve Wickham added his violin to the track The Pan Within; he had been invited after Scott had heard him on a Sinéad O'Connor demo recorded at Karl Wallinger's house.

The Waterboys (officially a trio of Scott, Thistlethwaite and Wallinger, with a slew of guests) released their third album, This Is the Sea, in October 1985. It sold better than either of the two earlier albums, and managed to get into the Top Forty. A single from it, "The Whole of the Moon", reached number 26 in the UK. Promotion efforts were hampered by Scott's refusal to perform on Top of the Pops, which insisted that its performers lip sync. The album release was followed by successful tours of the UK and North America, with Wickham becoming a full-time member, Marco Sin replacing Martyn Swain on bass, and Chris Whitten replacing Kevin Wilkinson on drums. Towards the end of the tour Wallinger left to form his own band, World Party, and was replaced by Guy Chambers. At the same time, drummer Dave Ruffy replaced Chris Whitten.

Late 1980s: The Raggle Taggle band 
At the invitation of new member Steve Wickham, Mike Scott moved to Dublin and quickly became influenced by the traditional Irish music there as well as by country and gospel. The band's line-up changed once again with Scott, Wickham and Thistlethwaite now joined by Trevor Hutchinson on bass and Peter McKinney on drums. The new band, which the official Waterboys' website refers to as the "Raggle Taggle band" line-up, spent 1986 and 1987 recording in Dublin and touring the UK, Ireland, Europe and Israel. Some of these performances were released in 1998 on The Live Adventures of the Waterboys, including a famous Glastonbury performance in 1986.

In 1988 Scott took the band to Spiddal in the west of Ireland where they set up a recording studio in Spiddal House to finish recording their new album. Fisherman's Blues was released in October 1988, and showcased many guest musicians that had played with the band in Dublin and Spiddal. Critics and fans were split between those embracing the new influence of Irish and Scottish folk music and others disappointed after hoping for a continuation of the style of This Is the Sea. World Music: The Rough Guide notes that "some cynics claim that Scotsman Mike Scott gave Irish music back to the Irish... his impact can't be underestimated", but Scott himself explains that it was the Irish tradition that influenced him; "I was in love with Ireland. Every day was a new adventure, it was mythical... Being part of a brotherhood of musicians was a great thing in those days, with all the many musicians of all stripes we befriended in Ireland. I still have that connection to the Irish musicians and tap into it..." Owing to the large number of tracks that were recorded in the three years between This Is the Sea and Fisherman's Blues, The Waterboys released a second album of songs from this period in 2001, titled Too Close to Heaven (or Fisherman's Blues, Part 2 in North America), and more material was released as bonus tracks for the 2006 reissue of the remastered Fisherman's Blues album.

After further touring the band returned to Spiddal to record a new album. The Waterboys now consisted of Mike Scott, Steve Wickham, Anthony Thistlethwaite, Colin Blakey on whistle, flute and piano, Sharon Shannon on accordion, Trevor Hutchinson on bass and Noel Bridgeman on drums. Their fifth album, Room to Roam was released in September 1990. One of the album's tracks was a recording of the traditional ballad "The Raggle Taggle Gypsy".

Just before Room to Roam was released, Wickham left over a disagreement with Scott and Thistlethwaite regarding the future direction of the band's sound. Scott and Thistlethwaite wanted to move the band back to a more rock and roll style, and Wickham disagreed. His departure started the band's dissolution, and in his wake Shannon and Blakey both left. Scott, Thistlethwaite and Hutchinson recruited Ken Blevins on drums to fulfil the group's tour dates.

End and return of the Waterboys 
Trevor Hutchinson left the band in 1991, a year that also saw a re-release of the single "The Whole of the Moon" from This Is the Sea and a compilation album, The Best of The Waterboys 81–90. The single reached number three on the United Kingdom charts and the album reached number two. Scott spent the rest of the year writing new material and moved to New York. Thistlethwaite left the band in December, leaving Mike Scott as The Waterboys' only member. The next album was completed with session musicians and was released in 1993 as Dream Harder with a new hard rock-influenced sound, and produced two UK Top 30 singles "The Return of Pan" and "Glastonbury Song"). Frustrated by not being able to get a new touring Waterboys band together, Scott left New York, abandoning the "Waterboys" name and embarking upon a solo career.

However, Scott later resurrected the Waterboys name, citing its recognition amongst fans, for the 2000 album A Rock in the Weary Land. The album had a new, experimental rock sound, inspired by contemporary bands Radiohead and Beck that "shocked" some listeners. Scott described the new sound as "Sonic Rock". A number of old Waterboys guested on the album including Thistlethwaite and Wilkinson. By 2001 the core of the new Waterboys included Mike Scott on vocals and guitar, Richard Naiff on keyboards and organs and Wickham, who had returned to the band, on violin. The group changed direction once again in 2003 and released Universal Hall a mostly acoustic album with a return of some Celtic influences from the Fisherman's Blues era. The album was followed by a tour of the UK and then Europe. Their first official live album, Karma to Burn, was released in 2005. A new studio album, Book of Lightning, was released 2 April 2007.

An Appointment With Mr. Yeats 
Having harboured the idea for 20 years, Mike Scott set 20 W. B. Yeats poems to music in an enterprise that evolved into a show entitled An Appointment With Mr. Yeats. The Waterboys held the show's world premiere from 15 to 20 March 2010 in Yeats's own theatre, the Abbey Theatre, Dublin. The five-night show quickly sold out, later receiving several rave reviews, among which were The Irish Times and Irish actor/playwright Michael Harding. Some of the poems performed included "The Hosting of the Sidhe", "The Lake Isle of Innisfree", "News for the Delphic Oracle", and 'The Song of Wandering Aengus', along with an amalgamation of two Yeats lyrics that became the song 'Let the Earth Bear Witness' which Scott had produced during 'The Sea of Green' 2009 Iranian election protests. The musical arrangements for the poems were varied and experimental. On the band's website Scott described the arrangements as "psychedelic, intense, kaleidescopic, a mix of rock, folk and faery music", the delivery of which signals yet another musical shift in the ever mutable world of The Waterboys.

An Appointment With Mr. Yeats returned to Dublin on 7 November 2010 in the city's Grand Canal Theatre. The show was performed at the Barbican Hall, London in February 2011. The album version of An Appointment With Mr. Yeats was released on 19 September 2011 and reached the UK Top 30.

2014–present 
In October 2014, the band announced their album Modern Blues, which was first released on 19 January 2015 in the United Kingdom, and was released on 7 April in North America. The album was recorded in Nashville, and produced by Mike Scott and mixed by Bob Clearmountain. The line up includes Paul Brown, David Hood, Ralph Salmins, Zach Ernst, and Steve Wickham. The first UK single from the Modern Blues album was 'November Tale'.

Modern Blues was followed in 2017 by a double studio album, Out of All This Blue, which was released on 8 September by BMG Records. The first single from the album was "If The Answer Is Yeah", released in July.

In March 2019 the band announced a new studio album Where the Action Is, which was released on 24 May by Cooking Vinyl. The first UK single from the album was 'Right Side Of Heartbreak (Wrong Side Of Love)', released on 14 March.

On 21 May 2019 the band have shared the music video for the third single off the record, "Ladbroke Grove Symphony" which it is a tribute to the former bohemian heart of West London. Mike Scott invokes his time living and writing among the crumbling, seaside-esque streets of Notting Hill during the 1980s. The accompanying montage video captures the magic of the Grove in all its weird and wonderful counterculture, and features new film and vintage photography of Scott he tells the story of the song.

The band's fourteenth studio album Good Luck, Seeker was released on 21 August 2020. The first song to be previewed from the album was "My Wanderings in the Weary Land" on 5 June. The single "The Soul Singer" was released on 15 July. The Waterboys' fifteenth studio album, All Souls Hill, was released by Cooking Vinyl on 6 May 2022.

Music 
The Waterboys' lyrics and arrangements reflect Scott's current interests and influences, the latter including the musical sensibilities of other members. Wickham in particular had a tremendous impact on the band's sound after joining the group. In terms of arrangement and instrumentation, rock and roll and Celtic folk music have played the largest roles in the band's sound. Literature and spirituality have played an important role in Scott's lyrics Other contributing factors include women and love, punk music's DIY ethic, the British poetic tradition, and Scott's experiences at Findhorn, where he has lived for some years.

Sound 
The Waterboys' music can be divided into three distinct styles. The first is represented by the first three albums, released between 1983 and 1985. The band's arrangements during this period, described by Allmusic as a "rich, dramatic sound... majestic", and typically referred to as "The Big Music", combined the rock and roll sound of early U2 with elements of classical trumpet (Lorimer), jazz saxophone (Thistlethwaite) and contemporary keyboards (Wallinger). Scott emphasised the arrangement's fullness by using production techniques similar to Phil Spector's "Wall of Sound". The archetypal example, the song "The Big Music", gave the style its name, but the best-selling example was "The Whole of the Moon", the song that the early 1980s Waterboys are best known for and that demonstrates both Wallinger's synthpop keyboard effects and the effectiveness of the brass section of the band.

After Wickham's joining and the move to Ireland, the band went three years before releasing another album.  Fisherman's Blues, and more particularly Room to Roam, traded "The Big Music"'s keyboards and brass for traditional instruments such as tin whistle, flute, fiddle, accordion, harmonica, and bouzouki. Celtic folk music replaced rock as the main inspiration for song arrangements on both albums.  Rolling Stone describes the sound as "an impressive mixture of rock music and Celtic ruralism..., Beatles and Donovan echoes and, of course, lots of grand guitar, fiddle, mandolin, whistle, flute and accordion playing". Traditional folk songs were recorded along with those written by Scott. "The Raggle Taggle Gypsy", a British folk ballad at least two hundred years old, was recorded on Room to Roam. It became closely associated with the band, much as the song "The Big Music" did, and also gave its name to describe the band's character. The recording emphasises how distinctly different the band's music had become in the five years since the last of "The Big Music" albums.

After the break-up of the "Raggle Taggle band", Scott used The Waterboys' name for Dream Harder and A Rock in the Weary Land. These two albums, separated by seven years and bookending Scott's solo album releases, were both rock albums but with distinctive approaches to that genre.  Dream Harder was described as "disappointingly mainstream", whereas the sound of the A Rock in the Weary Land was inspired by alternative music and was praised by critics. For 2003's Universal Hall, however, Wickham had once again rejoined the band, and that album saw a return of the acoustic folk instrumentation of the late 1980s Waterboys, with the exception of the song "Seek the Light", which is instead an idiosyncratic EBM track.

Literary influences 

Scott, who briefly studied literature and philosophy at the University of Edinburgh, has made heavy use of English literature in his music. The Waterboys have recorded poems set to music by writers including William Butler Yeats ("The Stolen Child" and "Love and Death"), George MacDonald ("Room to Roam"), and Robert Burns ("Ever to Be Near Ye"). A member of the Academy of American Poets writes that "The Waterboys' gift lies in locating Burns and Yeats within a poetic tradition of song, revelry, and celebration, re-invigorating their verses with the energy of contemporary music". So close is the identification of the Waterboys with their literary influences that the writer also remarks that "W.B.", the initials to which Yeats' first and middle names are often shortened, could also stand for "Waterboys". The Waterboys returned to W.B. Yeats in March 2010. Having arranged 20 of his poems to music, the band performed them as An Appointment With Mr Yeats for five nights at the Abbey Theatre, Dublin (which Yeats co-founded in 1904). The liner notes from the CD edition of Room to Roam acknowledge author C.S. Lewis as an influence, and the title of the song "Further Up, Further In" is taken from a line in his novel The Last Battle.

Scott has also a number of poetic tropes in lyrics, including anthropomorphism (e.g. "Islandman"), metaphor (e.g. "A Church Not Made with Hands", "The Whole of the Moon"), and metonymy (e.g. "Old England"). The latter song quotes from both Yeats and James Joyce. While the lyrics of the band have explored a large number of themes, symbolic references to water are especially prominent. Water is often referenced in their songs (e.g. "This Is the Sea", "Strange Boat", "Fisherman's Blues"). The Waterboys' logo, first seen on the album cover of The Waterboys, symbolises waves.

Spirituality 
The Waterboys' lyrics show influences from different spiritual traditions. The first is the romantic Neopaganism and esotericism of authors such as Yeats and Dion Fortune, which can be observed in the repeated references to the ancient Greek deity Pan in both "The Pan Within" and "The Return of Pan". Pan was also featured on the album art for Room to Roam. "Medicine Bow", a song from the recording sessions for This Is the Sea, refers to Native American spirituality in its use of the word "medicine" to mean spiritual power. Scott's interest in Native American issues is also demonstrated in his preliminary recordings for the group's debut album, which included the songs "Death Song of the Sioux Parts One & Two" and "Bury My Heart". "Bury My Heart" is a reference to Dee Brown's Bury My Heart at Wounded Knee. a history of Native Americans in the western United States. Scott took the traditional Sioux song "The Earth Only Endures" from Bury My Heart at Wounded Knee, and set it to new music; the arrangement appears on The Secret Life of the Waterboys. Christian imagery can be seen in the songs "December" from The Waterboys, "The Christ in You" on Universal Hall, and indirectly in the influence of C. S. Lewis in a number of other songs, but Scott writes that his lyrics are not influenced by Christianity.

Scott has also said, "I've always been interested in spirituality, and I've never joined any religion. And it really turns me off when people from one religion say theirs is the only way. And I believe all religions are just different ways to spirituality. And if you call that universality, well, then I'm all for it." Despite Scott's pluralist perspective, the Waterboys have been labelled as "Christian rock" by some reviewers and heathens by some Christians.

Membership 

Over seventy musicians have performed live as a Waterboy. Some have spent only a short time with the band, contributing to a single tour or album, while others have been long-term members with significant contributions. Scott has been the band's lead vocalist, motivating force, and principal songwriter throughout the group's history, but a number of other musicians are closely identified with the band.

Anthony Thistlethwaite was an original member of the band, and remained a member until 1991 when the band broke up, although he also joined a few recording sessions for A Rock in the Weary Land. After Scott and Wickham, Thistlethwaite has more songwriting credits than any other Waterboy. His saxophone (regularly featured in solos) was one half of the early group's distinctive brass section, while his mandolin playing came to the forefront during the group's Irish folk phase; but he has also played guitar, keyboards and a number of other instruments for the band. He pressed to return The Waterboys to a rock music sound after Room to Roam, but did not appear on Dream Harder, the result of that decision. He is now a member of The Saw Doctors, and has also released three solo albums.

Original member Kevin Wilkinson was the band's drummer from 1983 to 1984, and continued to play in some studio sessions afterwards. His later appeared on A Rock in the Weary Land. He led the rhythm section of the group during its "Big Music" phase, sometimes without the assistance of any bass guitar. Scott describes Wilkinson's drumming as "bright and angular, an unusual sound".

Karl Wallinger joined the group in 1983, shortly after its formation. He left the group two years later, but in that relatively short period made important contributions to both A Pagan Place and This Is the Sea. He co-wrote "Don't Bang the Drum", the environmentalism anthem on the latter album. His keyboards and synthesiser work expanded the group's sound, and he also did some studio work for demo sessions. Wallinger's World Party project was heavily influenced by his work with The Waterboys.

Roddy Lorimer's participation began in 1983, contributing his trumpet playing "on and off" until 1990. He and Thistlethwaite took turns leading the brass section of the band, and Lorimer was also a featured soloist, most famously on "The Whole of the Moon" and "Don't Bang the Drum". He further contributed backing vocals to the song. His trumpet style is a combination of his classical training with an experimental approach encouraged by Scott. Lorimer returned for some studio work in 2006.

Steve Wickham transformed the group when he joined in 1985; his interest in folk music directly resulted in the band's change of direction. His initial involvement with The Waterboys ended in 1990 when Scott and Thistlethwaite wanted to return to rock and roll, but Wickham rejoined the group again in 2000, and, as of 2007, continues to perform with the band. Described by Scott as "the world's greatest rock fiddle player", he has written more songs for the band than anyone other than Scott, including the group's handful of instrumental recordings.

Richard Naiff first recorded with the band in 1999, and joined permanently in 2000. As of 2007, he was a core member, along with Scott and Wickham. He is a classically trained pianist and flautist, and plays keyboards for The Waterboys. Ian McNabb described him as Scott's "find of the century" and reviewers have described him as "phenomenally talented". Naiff officially left The Waterboys in February 2009 to spend more time with his family.

Other notable past members have included Ian McNabb, leader of Icicle Works; Sharon Shannon, who became Ireland's all-time best-selling traditional musician; the experimental musician Thighpaulsandra, producer Guy Chambers, Patti Smith drummers Jay Dee Daugherty and Carlos Hercules, bassists Steve Walters and Mark Smith who was the band's bassist when he died on 3 November 2009.

The Waterboys line-up as of 2010 appeared at the world premiere of An Appointment With Mr Yeats at The Abbey Theatre, Dublin. They expanded into a 9-piece band in the autumn of 2017 for their tour of the UK, Ireland and Europe.

Current members

 Mike Scott – vocals, guitar, piano (1981–94, 1998–present)
 Steve Wickham – electric fiddle, mandolin (1985–90, 2001–present) 
 Ralph Salmins – drums (2011–present) 
 "Brother" Paul Brown – keyboards (2013–present)
 Jess Kav - vocalist  (2017–present) 
 Zeenie Summers - vocalist  (2017–present) 
 Aongus Ralston - bass  (2017–present)
 Eamon Ferris - drums  (2021-present)
Former members

Scott has stated that "We've had more members I believe than any other band in rock history" and believes that the nearest challengers are Santana and The Fall.

Discography

Studio albums
 The Waterboys (1983)
 A Pagan Place (1984)
 This Is the Sea (1985)
 Fisherman's Blues (1988)
 Room to Roam (1990)
 Dream Harder (1993)
 Bring 'Em All In (1995; as Mike Scott)
 Still Burning (1997; as Mike Scott)
 A Rock in the Weary Land (2000)
 Universal Hall (2003)
 Book of Lightning (2007)
 An Appointment with Mr Yeats (2011)
 Modern Blues (2015)
 Out of All This Blue (2017)
 Where the Action Is (2019)
 Good Luck, Seeker (2020)
 All Souls Hill (2022)

Notes

References
 Scott, Mike (2012) Adventures of a Waterboy. Jawbone. London.

Further reading
 Abrahams, Ian. Strange Boat. SAF Publishing, 2007.

External links

 Official web pages for Mike Scott and The Waterboys

  The Waterboys Fan Site -  http://waterboys.org.uk/  

 
Scottish rock music groups
Scottish folk rock groups
Celtic rock groups
New-age musicians
Musical groups established in 1983
Chrysalis Records artists
Findhorn community
Cooking Vinyl artists
Bertelsmann Music Group artists
Proper Records artists